This is the list of countries by inheritance tax rates. Inheritance tax or estate tax is the tax levied upon the wealth of a person at the time of his/her death before it is passed on to their heirs.

List

References

Taxation by country
Inheritance tax rates
Taxation-related lists